The Columnist is a play by American playwright David Auburn. It opened on Broadway's Samuel J. Friedman Theatre, under the direction of Daniel J. Sullivan. The play opened on April 25, 2012 and closed July 8, 2012 with John Lithgow starring as Joseph Alsop. The cast also included Margaret Colin, Boyd Gaines, Grace Gummer, Stephen Kunken, Marc Bonan and Brian J. Smith.

Background
In researching journalists, David Auburn became interested in frequent references to Joseph Alsop. "I I realized here was this person who was so well known, so influential — almost a household name in his day — and now he's completely obscure," explained Auburn. "And, the play kind of came out of wondering, 'How does that happen? How do you go from being that central figure to being, at first, a kind of joke and then almost forgotten?' It was in digging into that that I found the story."

Synopsis
Set between 1954 and 1968, American journalist Joseph Alsop finds his relevance fading as attention shifts from the Cold War to the Vietnam War.

Awards and nominations 
 2012 Tony Award for Best Actor in a Play nominee for John Lithgow

References

External links
 

2012 plays
Broadway plays
Plays by David Auburn